The Unitized Group Ration (UGR) is a United States military ration used by the United States Armed Forces and Department of Defense (DoD). It is intended to sustain groups of American service members with access to a field kitchen, serving as both a field ration and a garrison ration. It is the modern successor to several older alphabetized rations—namely the A-ration, B-ration, and T-ration—combining them under a single unified system. UGRs are designed to meet the Military Daily Recommended Allowance when averaged over a 5 to 10 day period, with each meal providing between 1,300 and 1,450 kcal.

The UGR was introduced in 1999, and is currently known to be used by the U.S. Army, U.S. Marine Corps, U.S. Air Force, and National Guard. The U.S. Navy also reportedly uses the UGR for disembarked operations, using the Navy Standard Core Menu (NSCM) aboard naval vessels.

The UGR's primary field and combat equivalent is the better-known Meal, Ready-to-Eat (MRE), with the First Strike Ration (FSR), Long Range Patrol (LRP), and Meal, Cold Weather (MCW) serving as specialized field equivalents.

History 
Prior to the UGR's implementation, the U.S. military had several different types of rations used to feed service members in the rear or out of combat. Among them were the A-ration, consisting of fresh, refrigerated, or frozen food prepared in a kitchen and served in a mess, dining facility, or elsewhere; the B-ration, consisting of packaged, preserved foods prepared in a field kitchen; and the T-ration, a semi-perishable meal packaged, heated, and served in a tray pack similar to frozen meals; among others.

However, this created issues for cooks, who "had to order an average of 34 separate items for each meal, and could only hope that they arrived when needed", forcing them to manage logistics and administrative functions instead of solely food preparation. Around 1995, the U.S. military launched a modernization program to resolve this issue while also increasing the quality and decreasing the cost of existing rations. Research was headed by the U.S. Army Natick Soldier Research, Development and Engineering Center and the U.S. Army Quartermaster Center and School. In an effort to simplify logistics and ensure all necessary ingredients were provided, the UGR was created in 1999, combining elements and offerings of the A-ration, B-ration, T-ration, and commercial items.

The UGR was initially trialed with the Army, with their first shipments received around 2000; the Air Force, Marine Corps, and Navy also began receiving UGRs at unspecified dates. The UGR-E was introduced in 2006. The UGR-B was phased out and replaced by the mostly similar UGR-M at an unspecified date.

Types 
As of 2023, four types of Unitized Group Rations exist.

Heat & Serve 

The Unitized Group Ration – Heat & Serve (UGR-H&S) is the successor to the T-ration, and consists of precooked, shelf-stable tray pack entrées. The UGR-H&S is hermetically sealed can be prepared using a tray ration heater or by immersing it in boiling water, ready to serve in 30 to 45 minutes. The UGR-H&S has an offering of 5 breakfast menus and 10 lunch/dinner menus; each meal provides an average of 1,450 kcal. Each UGR-H&S module contains 50 meals, with each pallet holding 400 meals. UGR-H&S modules have a minimum shelf life of 18 months at 80 °F (26.6 °C).

A Option 

The Unitized Group Ration – A (UGR-A) is the successor to the A-ration, and consists of perishable entrées intended to be prepared in a field kitchen. The UGR-A is the only UGR with frozen food, and thus requires refrigeration to store and prepare. The UGR-A has an offering of 7 breakfast menus and 14 lunch/dinner menus; each meal provides an average of 1,450 kcal. Each UGR-A module contains 50 meals, with each pallet holding 600 meals. UGR-A modules have a minimum shelf life of 9 months outside the contiguous U.S. and 3 months within the contiguous U.S., at 80 °F (26.6 °C) for semi-perishable modules and 0 °F (-17.7 °C) for perishable modules.

A, Short Order 
The Unitized Group Ration – A, Short Order (UGR-A SO) consists of meals intended to supplement the UGR-A and expand available food options or feed larger groups, especially where alternate dining facilities or existing meal options are unavailable. Most UGR-A SO meals are based on fast food, pub food, and finger food. The UGR-A SO has the same kilocalorie amount, storage, and minimum shelf life as the regular UGR-A.

M Option 

The Unitized Group Ration – M (UGR-M), formerly the Unitized Group Ration – B (UGR-B), is the successor to the B-ration, and consists of packaged and dehydrated unprepared food intended to be assembled and prepared in a field kitchen. Designed to suit the needs of the U.S. Marine Corps, each UGR-M comes with ingredients that are primarily tailored toward specific recipes but could potentially be used to prepare other dishes. The UGR-M has an offering of 7 breakfast menus and 14 lunch/dinner menus; each meal provides an average of 1,300 kcal. Each UGR-M module contains 50 meals, with each pallet holding 400 meals. UGR-M modules have a minimum shelf life of 18 months at 80 °F (26.6 °C).

Express 

The Unitized Group Ration – Express (UGR-E or UGR-Express), nicknamed the "kitchen in a carton", consists of meals in self-heating steam table trays based on the UGR-H&S meal offerings. The UGR-E is designed to provide hot meals where feeding a group with hot food would otherwise be unfeasible; unlike other UGRs, it uses a flameless ration heater and does not require a separate field kitchen. The UGR-E begins heating with the pull of a tab, and can fully heat a meal within 30 to 45 minutes. The UGR-E has an offering of 4 breakfast menus, 8 lunch/dinner menus, and 1 holiday menu; each meal provides an average of 1,300 kcal. Each UGR-E module contains 50 meals, with each pallet holding 400 meals. UGR-E modules have a minimum shelf life of 18 months at 80 °F (26.6 °C).

Menus 

The UGR comes in two menu variations: breakfast and lunch/dinner. Menus are intended to be cycled through regularly. They include both standard American cuisine and diverse cuisines. The UGR-E also has a unique holiday menu variant.

UGR modules come with mandatory and optional meal supplements—namely UHT milk, cereal, bread, fruits, vegetables, salads, drink mixes, and condiments—as well as eating utensils, kitchen utensils, disposable mess trays, cups, napkins, and trash bags.

Menu options 
The menus below are adapted from lists available on the website of the Defense Logistics Agency (DLA). UGR menus are regularly modified to improve their variety, nutrition, and efficiency. As the DLA does not regularly publish UGR menus, the lists below use the 2020 menu for the UGR-H&S, 2023 menu for the UGR-A, 2014 menu for the UGR-M, and 2021 menu for the UGR-E.

Note that the lists below do not include milk, bread, fruit, or salad supplements, nor items standard to most UGRs such as regular coffee and hot sauce.

Production 

A variety of contractors are involved in the production, management, and distribution of UGRs and their contents, including (as of 2023) ABC Ventures, AmeriQual, Atlantic, Chef Minute Meals, Club Tex, Envision, Inc., Epic Foods, Gossner Foods, Hershey, HOIST, LC Industries, Nex-Xos, OhSix, Oregon Freeze Dry, Sterling Foods, Sopakco, Valley Foods, Werling Meats, and Wornick. More than 60,000 UGRs are produced yearly.

UGRs are supplied by the DLA's Operational Rations Division. UGRs, like other rations, cannot be sold to individuals, and are only supplied or sold to the U.S. military, the DoD, the federal government, government employee commissaries, government contractors (if their contract specifically permits such purchases), foreign governments with authorized contractual relationships, and civilians as humanitarian aid.

Reception 
American service members generally find UGRs to taste better than MREs. The UGR-E in particular was positively received, with the holiday menu singled out as "a morale booster" for soldiers otherwise unable to have proper Thanksgiving or Christmas dinners on deployment. However, some items—namely egg dishes, as reported by Stars and Stripes in 2005—are widely disliked due to poor taste. Some soldiers have also cautioned against mixing or switching between UGRs and MREs, which is said to cause constipation.

See also 

 K-ration – older multiple-course field ration
 5-in-1 ration – older group ration for five soldiers
 10-in-1 food parcel – older group ration for ten soldiers

References 

Food packaging
Military food of the United States
Military food